Saint-Jory is a railway station located in Saint-Jory, Occitanie, France. The station is located on the Bordeaux–Sète railway. The station is served by TER (local) services operated by SNCF.

Train services
As of 2022, the following services call at Saint-Jory:
local service (TER Occitanie) Brive-la-Gaillarde–Cahors–Montauban–Toulouse
local service (TER Occitanie) Montauban–Toulouse

References

Railway stations in Haute-Garonne